Henry Charles Hewitt (28 December 1885 – 23 August 1968) was an English stage, film and television actor. He made his stage debut in 1905.

Filmography

References

External links
 

1885 births
1968 deaths
English male stage actors
English male film actors
English male television actors
Male actors from London
20th-century English male actors